Dositej Obradović (17 February 1739 – 7 April 1811) was a Serbian writer, biographer, diarist, philosopher, pedagogue, educational reformer, linguist, polyglot and the first minister of education of Serbia. An influential protagonist of the Serbian national and cultural renaissance, he advocated Enlightenment and rationalist ideas, while remaining a Serbian patriot and an adherent of the Serbian Orthodox Church.

Life 
Dositej Obradović was born Dimitrije Obradović, probably in 1739, in the Banat village of Čakovo, in the Habsburg monarchy, now Ciacova, in present-day Romania. From an early age, he was possessed with a passion for study. Obradović grew up bilingual (in Serbian and Romanian) and learned classical Greek, Latin, modern Greek, German, English, French, Russian, Albanian and Italian.

On 17 February 1757 he became a monk in the Serb Orthodox monastery of Hopovo, in the Srem region, and acquired the name Dositej (Dositheus).  He translated into Serbian many European classics, including Aesop's Fables.

Having devoured the contents of the monastery library, he hungered for further learning. On 2 November 1760 he left the monastery of Hopovo, bound for Hilandar, Mount Athos.

In 1761 he went to Zagreb where he studied Latin. From 1761 to 1763 he was a teacher in a Serbian school in Kninsko Polje. For a brief period, he taught at a monastery in the Bay of Kotor before he was ordained as a priest by Vasilije Petrović. After falling ill, he returned to teach in Dalmatia in the village of Golubić near Knin. He then went to Corfu where he studied Greek before going to Venice and then coming back to Dalmatia where he became a teacher again, in Plavno. He later enrolled at the University of Halle where he studied Philosophy. In 1783, he transferred to the University of Leipzig and published his first work. He was a student of Johann Eberhard who himself was a disciple of Christian Wolf. More than a third of his life was spent in Austria where Obradović became influenced by the ideas of Joseph II and the German Enlightenment. Additionally, he was an Anglophile and influenced by English educators, seeing England as the land of spiritual freedom and modern civilization.

Besides these countries, his forty year travel journeys across Europe and Asia Minor also took him to Albania, Greece, Hungary, Turkey, Romania, France, Russia, England, and Poland. Finally he went to Belgrade, at the invitation of Karađorđe Petrović, to become, in the newly organized government, Serbia's first minister of education.

Obradović wrote first individual biographies and quickly the genre expanded to the form of biographical collection modelled on examples of Nepos, Suetonius, Plutarch, or Diogenes Laertius.

Obradović helped introduce to the Serbs the literature of certain western European countries. He and Vuk Karadžić, whom Obradović influenced, are recognized as the fathers of modern Serbian literature. Because the Serbian populace often suffered famine, Obradović also introduced potato cultivation to Serbia.

Dositej Obradović died in Belgrade, Serbia, in 1811.

Works
Slovo poučiteljno Gosp. Georg. Joakima Colikofera, Leipzig, 1774, 31 pp.
Pismo Haralampiju, 1783.
Život i priključenija D.O., Leipzig, 1783.
Sovjeti zdravago razuma, Leipzig, 1784, 119 pp.
Ezopove i pročih raznih basnotvorcev basne, Leipzig, 1788, 451 pp.
Pesme o izbavleniju Serbije, Vienna, 1789, 4 pp.
Sobranije raznih naravoučitelnih veščej, Pécs, 1793, 2 + 316 pp.
Etika ili filozofija naravnoučitelna, Venice, 1803, 160 pp.
Vostani Serbije, 1804.
Mezimac, Budim 1818, 230 + 11 pp.
Ižica, 1830
Pisma, Budapest, 1829, 126 pp.
Prvenac, Karlštat 1930, 17 + 168 pp.
Jastuk roda moga (lost), 1813

Translations
Slovo poučitelno, 1784.
Istina i prelest, (short story), 1788.
Put u jedan dan, (short story), 1788.
Aesop's Fables
Hristoitija
Bukvica
Etika
Venac
Damon
Ingleska izrečenija

In popular culture 
, a television miniseries based on the biography of Dositej Obradović and directed by Sava Mrmak, was produced in 1990 by the Serbian broadcasting service RTS.

See also
Fables
Vostani Serbije
Avram Mrazović

References

Sources

Further reading

 Cassell's Encyclopaedia of World Literature, Volume 2, Funk & Wagnalls, 1954.
 Chambers Biographical Dictionary, Chambers Harrap, 1997.
 Ćurčić, N. M. J. The Ethics of Reason in the Philosophical System of Dositej Obradovic A Study of His Contribution in This Field to the Age of Reason. London: Unwin Bros. Ltd, 1976.
 Fischer, Wladimir, "The Role of Dositej Obradovic in the Construction of Serbian Identities During the 19th Century," Spaces of Identity (1.3, 2001), 67–87.
 Fischer, Wladimir: Creating a National Hero: The Changing Symbolics of Dositej Obradović. In: Identität – Kultur – Raum. Turia + Kant, Wien 2001, .
 Fischer, Wladimir, "Dositej Obradović and the Ambivalence of Enlightenment". Heppner/Posch (eds.), Encounters in Europe's Southeast, Bochum: Winkler, 2012, .
 
 Merriam-Webster's Biographical Dictionary, Merriam-Webster, 1995.
 Obradović, Dositej. The Life and Adventures of Dimitrije Obradović. University of California Publications in Modern Philology 39. Berkeley; Los Angeles, 1953.
 Pijanović, Petar: Život i delo Dositeja Obradovića. Zavod za udžbenike i nastavna sredstva, Beograd 2000.
 "South Slavic Writers Before World War II". Dictionary of Literary Biography, Volume 147, Gale Research, 1995.
 Skerlić, Jovan, Istorija Nove Srpske Književnosti (Belgrade, 1914, 1921).

1739 births
1811 deaths
18th-century Serbian people
Academic staff of Belgrade Higher School
Burials at St. Michael's Cathedral (Belgrade)
Eastern Orthodox Christians from Serbia
Eastern Orthodox philosophers
Habsburg Serbs
Members of the Serbian Orthodox Church
People from Ciacova
People of the First Serbian Uprising
People of the Military Frontier
Serbian male poets
Serbian translators
Serbs of Romania
Writers from Belgrade
Serbs of Hungary
Education ministers of Serbia